LA-5 is a constituency of Azad Kashmir Legislative Assembly which is currently represented by the Waqar Ahmad Noor of the Pakistan Muslim League (N). It covers the area of Barnala Tehsil in Bhimber District of Azad Kashmir, Pakistan.

Election 2016

References

Bhimber District
Azad Kashmir Legislative Assembly constituencies